Noel Tutangata (born 27 April 1975) in the Cook Islands is a footballer who plays as a midfielder. He currently plays for Takuvaine in the Cook Islands Round Cup and the Cook Islands national football team.

References

1975 births
Living people
Cook Islands international footballers
Association football midfielders
Cook Island footballers